Benjamin Faucher (April 12, 1915 – December 26, 1990) was a Canadian provincial politician. He was the Liberal member of the National Assembly of Quebec for Yamaska and Nicolet-Yamaska from 1970 to 1976.

References

1915 births
1990 deaths
People from Centre-du-Québec
Quebec Liberal Party MNAs